The B. H. Campbell House is a historic home in Wichita, Kansas with distinctive castle like architecture. It is listed on the National Register of Historic Places. 

Built of limestone, the home's interior features cherry, walnut, and mahogany wood. The residential building is now a bed and breakfast. It is at 1155 N. River Blvd. Burton "Barbecue" Harvey Campbell was a cattle baron and investor. The home has 5-story turret and stained glass from Europe. It is on the other side of North River Boulevard from the Little Arkansas River.

See also
National Register of Historic Places listings in Sedgwick County, Kansas

References

National Register of Historic Places in Wichita, Kansas